Dendrobium bifalce, commonly known as the native bee orchid, is an epiphytic or lithophytic orchid in the family Orchidaceae. It has spindle-shaped pseudobulbs with up to four leathery leaves and up to ten pale green or greenish yellow flowers with purplish markings. It grows on trees and boulders in rainforest in tropical North Queensland, Australia and in New Guinea.

Description
The side lobes are sickle-shaped and curve upwards and the middle lobe has a narrowed middle and a warty ridge along its midline. Flowering occurs from April to July.

Taxonomy and naming
Dendrobium bifalce was first formally described in 1843 by John Lindley from a specimen collected in New Guinea by Richard Brinsley Hinds. The specific epithet (bifalce) is a derived from the Latin bi- meaning "two" and falce meaning "sickles".

Distribution and habitat
The native bee orchid grows on boulders and trees in rainforest in New Guinea and in Australia from the Torres Strait Islands to the Daintree National Park.

References

bifalce
Orchids of Queensland
Orchids of New Guinea
Endemic orchids of Australia
Plants described in 1843